The  South San Francisco Ferry Terminal is the only operating ferry terminal in San Mateo County, California. Boats are operated by San Francisco Bay Ferry and connect the city of South San Francisco to the Oakland Ferry Terminal in Jack London Square as well as Alameda, California.  Construction began in 2009 and ferry service started on June 4, 2012. While ferry service between San Francisco and ports to the south existed as far south as San Jose/Alviso during the 1800s, most passengers to Peninsula destinations took the San Francisco and San Jose Railroad after it was completed in 1864 as part of the transcontinental railway.

Design and construction
The new ferry terminal is the first ferry terminal built south of San Francisco in several generations. The Oyster Point Marina land is owned by the City of South San Francisco (SSF). The San Mateo County Harbor District operates the land under a Joint Powers Agreement with the City of SSF.

A 1992 report stated that ferry service between SSF and San Francisco (Ferry Building) or San Leandro would not be feasible, based on low projected ridership and inadequate farebox recovery ratios. Because neither city had a strong history of transit ridership for ridership were low - 155 passengers per day for the ride to San Francisco, and 50 to 150 passengers per day between SSF and San Leandro.

The two ferries are the twin-hull catamaran Gemini and Pisces, dubbed the "nation's most environmentally-friendly ferries," each equipped with low-emissions diesel engines and featuring space for 149 passengers, 34 bicycles, on-board Wi-Fi, and solar panels.

Operation

Connections
The nearest freeway connection is the Oyster Point Boulevard exit from Highway 101. There is on-site parking for 35 vehicles and 24 bicycles.

A free shuttle bus, sponsored by local employers but open to the public, connects the South San Francisco Ferry Terminal, Oyster Point area office buildings, and the South San Francisco Caltrain station during weekday commute hours.

Ridership
The farebox recovery ratio was 17% at the end of 2013, and the service was in jeopardy of not meeting the required 40% recovery ratio by the end of the 2014–15 fiscal year on June 30, 2015. As of 2017, the farebox recovery ratio had increased to 38%.

Routes
Offer service to Alameda, Oakland on the weekdays starting in 2012.

One round trip per day is scheduled to the San Francisco Ferry Building (next to south side of Ferry Building - Gate E) and Pier 41 (Behind ticketing building window/Ben & Jerry's Ice Cream) on Wednesday and Fridays effective April 29, 2013. Return times are approximately 30 minutes from SSF to SF Ferry Building, but these differ by the day of the week. 

Pier 39 service was discontinued in 2014.

References

External links

Official Website
Harbor District Website
Water Emergency Transportation Authority

South San Francisco, California
Transportation buildings and structures in San Mateo County, California
Ferry terminals in the San Francisco Bay Area
2012 establishments in California